Hyde Park station is an at-grade light rail station on the K Line of the Los Angeles Metro Rail system. It is located in the median of Crenshaw Boulevard between its intersections with Slauson Avenue and 59th Street in the Hyde Park neighborhood of Los Angeles.

The station opened on October 7, 2022. Metro held a ceremonial ribbon cutting ceremony for the station on August 6, 2022.

The station features art by Carlson Hatton that visually celebrates the musical heritage of the area.

Service

Station layout

Hours and frequency

Connections 
, the following connections are available:
LADOT DASH: Leimert/Slauson

Notable places nearby 
The station is within walking distance of the following notable places:
 Nipsey Hussle's The Marathon Clothing Company and memorial
 View Park Preparatory High School

References 

K Line (Los Angeles Metro) stations
Crenshaw, Los Angeles
Railway stations in the United States opened in 2022